Denison Mines Corp. is a Canadian uranium exploration, development, and production company. Founded by Stephen B. Roman, and best known for its uranium mining in Blind River and Elliot Lake, it later diversified into coal, potash, and other projects.

History 

About 1,000 workers at Denison's Elliot Lake mines went on strike in 1974, protesting unhealthy working conditions. The protest led to immediate improvements in safety conditions, and prompted Bill Davis to commission James Milton Ham to lead the Royal Commission on the Health and Safety of Workers in Mines.

Denison served as manager for Uranium Participation Corporation, a Toronto-based investment fund which holds no license to deal in uranium until 2021 before it was sold to Sprott Asset Management and WMC Energy.

Ownership and leadership 
15% of the company is owned by Korea Electric Power Corporation (KEPCO).

The CEO is David D. Cates, and Ron F. Hochstein is the chair of the board.

Operations 
Denison's principal assets are its northern Saskatchewan interests in the McClean Lake mine, the Midwest Uranium Project and the Wheeler River project. Denison also manages decommissioned uranium mines in the Elliot Lake area.

In 2013, Denison purchased a number of uranium exploration projects from Fission Energy, including the Waterbury Lake uranium development and other properties in the Athabasca Basin.

In January 2017 Denison announced it had executed an agreement to increase ownership of the Wheeler River Uranium Project in the Athabasca Basin to 66%.

See also
Uranium mining in the Elliot Lake area
Uranium
Nuclear energy
Nuclear power

References

External links
 Denison Mines company website

Companies listed on NYSE American
Companies based in Toronto
Companies listed on the Toronto Stock Exchange
Elliot Lake
Uranium mining companies of Canada